Kennedy J. Reed is an American theoretical atomic physicist in the Theory Group in the Physics & Advanced Technologies Directorate at Lawrence Livermore National Laboratory (LLNL) and a founder of the National Physical Science Consortium (NPSC), a group of about 30 universities that provides physics fellowships for women and minorities.

Reed earned his Ph.D. at the University of Nebraska, was a professor of physics at Morehouse College, in Atlanta, Georgia and is known for his work related to ionization and atomic collisions in high temperature plasmas. He has published more than 100 papers.

Demonstrating a commitment to improving the participation of minority and female students in the physical sciences, Dr. Reed has helped more than 100 such students to earn their doctorates and, through the NPSC consortium, awarded over 300 graduate fellowships.

Awards
In 2003, Professor Reed received the American Physical Society’s John Wheatley Award. He was the recipient of the 2009 Presidential Award for Excellence in Science, Mathematics and Engineering Mentoring and is a fellow of the American Physical Society from President Barack Obama.

In 2011, he was awarded the distinction of being elected as a fellow of the American Association for the Advancement of Science.

He was president of the International Union of Pure and Applied Physics (IUPAP) from 2017 to October 2019 when he chose to step down for personal reasons.  He also serves on the National Academy of Sciences Board on International Scientific Organizations and is a charter fellow and previous president of the National Society of Black Physicists.

Kennedy Reed Award
Named after Kennedy Reed for his outstanding contribution in theoretical physics, APS Farwest section established the Kennedy Reed award for Best Theoretical Research to recognize the best research in theoretical physics by a graduate student in the annual meeting of APS Farwest section.

Africa
Cited for his work in promoting physics research and education in Africa, and collaborative projects between African and African American scientists, Reed has been a visiting scientist at the Cheikh Anta Diop University in Senegal and at the University of Cape Coast in Ghana. He lectures at numerous other African universities and has organized numerous international scientific conferences connected with Africa.

He has also organized U.S. visits for African physicists including formal meetings and presentations at universities and high-level meetings in Washington, DC with government agencies such as the National Science Foundation, USAID, American Astronomical Society, and United States National Research Council and is on the international advisory panel for the African School on Electronic Structure Methods and Applications.

Publications

References

External links 
 Professor Kennedy Reed, Physicist, Lawrence Livermore National Laboratory 
 Professor Kennedy Reed, CV

Further reading
Kessler, J., Kidd, J. Kidd R. & Morin, K. (1996). Distinguished African American Scientists of the 20th Century. Phoenix, AZ: Oryx Press. pp. 280–284.

Fellows of the American Association for the Advancement of Science
Fellows of the American Physical Society
21st-century American physicists
Theoretical physicists
Living people
Monmouth College alumni
Year of birth missing (living people)
Presidents of the International Union of Pure and Applied Physics
African-American physicists